Xinxing District may refer to:

 Xinxing District, Qitaihe, Heilongjiang, China
 Sinsing District, Kaohsiung, Taiwan

See also
Xinxing (disambiguation), other places named Xinxing

District name disambiguation pages